Ships called Oden include:

 Oden, a Swedish , launched in 1896
 , broken up in 1988
 , a large Swedish icebreaker, built in 1988

Ship names